Hunter's Moon is the second EP by Dutch symphonic metal band Delain. It was released on 22 February 2019. It is the first release to feature Joey de Boer on drums and the last release to feature guitarist Merel Bechtold.

Track listing

Personnel 
Delain
 Charlotte Wessels – lead vocals
 Timo Somers – lead guitar, backing vocals, screams
 Merel Bechtold – rhythm guitar
 Otto Schimmelpenninck van der Oije – bass
 Martijn Westerholt – keyboards
 Joey de Boer – drums on tracks 1-4
 Ruben Israel – drums on tracks 5-14

Guests
 Twan Driessen – guest vocals on track 4
 George Oosthoek – live guest vocals on track 5
 Marko Hietala – live guest vocals on tracks 8, 9, 10, 11, 13 and 14
 Elianne Anemaat – live cello on track 7

Production
 Martijn Westerholt – production on tracks 1-2 and 5-14
 Timo Somers – production on track 3
 Merel Bechtold – production on track 4
 Jacob Hansen – mixing on tracks 1 and 2
 Bas Trumpie – mixing on tracks 3-14
 Imre Beerends – mixing on tracks 3-14
 Mika Jussila – mastering on tracks 3-14
 Mikko Mustonen – orchestrals
 Cam Rackam – cover art
 Marnix de Klerk – graphic design
 Sandra Ludewig – photos
 Charlotte Wessels – art direction

Charts

References

2019 EPs
Delain albums
Napalm Records EPs